Kaufman Independent School District is a public school district based in Kaufman, Texas, United States.

In addition to Kaufman, the district serves the cities of Oak Ridge, Oak Grove, and Post Oak Bend.

In 2009, the school district was rated "recognized" by the Texas Education Agency.

Schools
Gary W. Campbell High School/Alternative Learning Center (grades 9-12)
Kaufman High School (grades 9-12)
O.P. Norman Junior High (grades 6-8)
Lucille Nash Elementary (grades 1-5)
J.R. Phillips Elementary (grades 1-5)
J.W. Monday Elementary (grades 1-5)
Helen Edwards Early Childhood Center (prekindergarten-kindergarten)

References

External links
 
 
 Kaufman ISD official account on Twitter

School districts in Kaufman County, Texas